A combo box is a commonly used graphical user interface widget (or control). Traditionally, it is a combination of a drop-down list or list box and a single-line editable textbox, allowing the user to either type a value directly or select a value from the list. The term "combo box" is sometimes used to mean "drop-down list". In both Java and .NET, "combo box" is not a synonym for "drop-down list". Definition of "drop down list" is sometimes clarified with terms such as "non-editable combo box" (or something similar) to distinguish it from "combo box".

See also 
Autocomplete
Drop-down list
List box
User interface

References

External links
List and Combo boxes for Microsoft Access

Graphical control elements